Paul Arnold Wiegert (born 1967) is a Canadian astronomer, discoverer of minor planets and professor at the University of Western Ontario.

Wiegert studies unusual orbits of both observed objects and theorised classes of objects, for example, one early paper considers not-known-to-exist planets orbiting the nearby Alpha Centauri star system, while later papers extend that case to more general planetary stability in general binary systems (as exoplanet studies are finding increasingly frequently). This work in particular should be of interest to science fiction authors inventing universes.

Other areas of work include identifying the orbits of minor planets in the Solar System, which by virtue of their potential instability could realistically become major threats to civilization when one impacts on Earth again, as they have in the past. The Minor Planet Center credits him with the discovery of 80 numbered minor planets between 2003 and 2008. Wiegert was also involved in the discovery of 3753 Cruithne, Earth's first known Trojan asteroid.

The outer main-belt asteroid 15068 Wiegert was named in his honor.

List of discovered minor planets

References

External links 
 Paul Wiegert's home page at the University of Western Ontario

21st-century Canadian astronomers
Discoverers of minor planets

Living people
Academic staff of the University of Western Ontario
1967 births